Mauro Pagani (born 5 February 1946) is an Italian musician and singer.

Pagani was born in Chiari, Lombardy. A multi-instrumentalist, he made his debut in the music world in 1970 as violinist and founding member of the progressive rock band Premiata Forneria Marconi. In 1977 he left the band to follow a solo career, but in 2003 rejoined for a celebrative concert. His first solo album, titled "Mauro Pagani" (released in Tokyo in 1979 on Seven Seas and distributed by King Record Co.) included contributions by fellow PFM members Franz Di Cioccio, Patrick Djivas, and Walter Calloni; also showcasing an impressive line-up of guest musicians, including Area's Demetrio Stratos, Peter Gabriel, Giulio Capiozzo, Patrizio Fariselli, Ellade Bandini and Ares Tavolazzi ("L'Albero Di Canto" and "L'Albero Di Canto II" with Area backing Mauro exclusively). Roberto Colombo also played polimoog on "La Città Aromatica".

Pagani has been an experimenter of sound related to blues and Mediterranean music. He also collaborated with other famous artists, including Roberto Vecchioni, Gianna Nannini, Luciano Ligabue,  Ornella Vanoni, and Fabrizio De André, with whom he composed the renowned LPs Crêuza de mä (1984) and Le nuvole (1990).

He composed the soundtrack for four movies by the Italian director Gabriele Salvatores, Sogno di una notte d'estate (1983), Puerto Escondido (1992),  Nirvana (1995) and Siberian Education (2013)

Selected discography
With Premiata Forneria Marconi (PFM)
Storia di un minuto (1972, PFM)
Per un amico (1972, PFM)
Photos Of Ghosts (1973, PFM)
L'isola di Niente (The World became the World) (1974, PFM)
Chocolate Kings (1975, PFM)
Solo and Collaboration
Mauro Pagani (1978)
Sogno di una notte d'estate (1981)
Passa la bellezza (1991)
Puerto Escondido (1992, soundtrack)
Nirvana (1995, soundtrack)
Psycho P. (2001)
2004 Crêuza de mä (2004, re-arranged version of the 1984 original)
Siberian Education (2013)

References

External links
Official website
PFM's official website

1946 births
Living people
Musicians from the Province of Brescia
Italian male singer-songwriters
Italian singer-songwriters
Italian composers
Italian male composers
Italian blues musicians
Premiata Forneria Marconi members